Accoville is an unincorporated community and census-designated place (CDP) in Logan County, West Virginia, United States. The community lies along Buffalo Creek. As of the 2010 United States Census, its population was 574.

Geography
Accoville is in southeastern Logan County, in the valley of Buffalo Creek, and extending to the east up its Right Fork. It is bordered by Amherstdale to the northeast (up Buffalo Creek) and by Kistler to the southwest (down the creek).

History
Accoville derived its name from the local Amherst Coal Company (ACCO). 

Accoville was in the path of the Buffalo Creek flood in 1972. The devastating man made disaster was caused by a Coal Mine dam failure located by a hillside.

Accoville's Don Israel Bragg, 33, was killed in the 2006 Aracoma Alma Mine disaster in Melville, along with Ellery Hatfield, 47, of Simon.

Notable people
Accoville is the birthplace of Ted Belcher, a U.S. Army soldier and recipient of the U.S. military's highest decoration, the Medal of Honor, for his actions in the Vietnam War.

References

Census-designated places in Logan County, West Virginia
Census-designated places in West Virginia